Chautauqua County is the name of two counties in the United States:

 Chautauqua County, Kansas 
 Chautauqua County, New York